Marcus Hammond (born 1938) is an English actor who was active in the 1960s and 1970s, playing the role of Antodus in the 1963 Doctor Who serial The Daleks, as well as recurring roles in Z-Cars as PC Taylor and Kate as Stephen Graham. He also appeared in the 1966 films Where the Bullets Fly, and the Hammer film The Plague of the Zombies as Tom Martinus.

Under his real name John Hammond, during the 1990s, he also ran "The Little Gallery" in Porlock Weir, Somerset, UK, where he sold his paintings and those of other local artists.

Filmography

Film

Television

References

External links

English male film actors
English male television actors
Living people
1938 births